The Church of St James is a Church of England parish church in Curry Mallet, Somerset. It has 13th-century origins and has been designated as a Grade I listed building.

History
The church is dedicated to All Saints, It has a three-stage tower. On the stonework are hunky punks representing animals. Inside the church is a 15th-century font.

Present day
The parish is part of the Seven Sowers benefice which covers Beercrocombe, Curry Mallet, Hatch Beauchamp, Orchard Portman, Staple Fitzpaine, Stoke St Mary (with Thurlbear) and West Hatch, within the deanery of Crewkerne and Ilminster.

See also

 List of Grade I listed buildings in South Somerset
 List of towers in Somerset
 List of ecclesiastical parishes in the Diocese of Bath and Wells

References

13th-century church buildings in England
Church of England church buildings in South Somerset
Grade I listed churches in Somerset
Grade I listed buildings in South Somerset
Conservative evangelical Anglican churches in England